The International Judo Federation (IJF) is the international governing body for judo, founded in July 1951. The IJF was originally composed of judo federations from Europe and Argentina. Countries from four continents were affiliated over the next ten years. Today the IJF has 200 National Federations on all continents. There are over 20 million people around the globe who practice judo, according to the IJF.

History
Since 2009, IJF has organized yearly World Championships and the World Judo Tour consisting of five Grand Prix, four Grand Slams, a master tournament, and a Continental open tournament.

The IJF initially named Russian President Vladimir Putin its honorary president and IJF Ambassador in 2008. That status of Putin's was suspended in 2022, in reaction to the Russian invasion of Ukraine.

The IJF also cancelled all competitions in Russia, but allowed their athletes to compete as neutral athletes.

After the 2022 Russian invasion of Ukraine, all of the other 31 international Olympic sports organizations banned Russian athletes.  But IJF President Marius Vizer, a long-time close friend of Russian President Vladimir Putin, wanted instead to let Russians and Belarusians continue to compete as neutral athletes. Finally, both national federations withdrew of their own accord, until June 2022 when they again competed. Ukraine boycotted IJF events beginning in June 2022 because the Russian team was allowed to compete in and entered competitions. Judo is one of the few Olympic sports which goes against the recommendation  of the International Olympic Committee.

Events
 World Judo Championships
 World Judo Juniors Championships (1974 to 2011 U20 / 2012 to now U21)
 World Judo Cadets Championships (U18)
 World Veterans Judo Championships (30 to +80 in 11 Age Group)
 World Kata Judo Championships
 IJF World Tour (Masters, Grand Slam, Grand Prix, Continental Open)
 Judo European Cup

Presidents of the IJF
Aldo Torti, Italy, 1951
Risei Kano, son of Kanō Jigorō, Japan, 1952–1965
Charles Palmer Great Britain, 1965–1979
Shigeyoshi Matsumae, Japan,  1979–1987 
Sarkis Kaloghlian, Argentina, 1987–1989 
Lawrie Hargrave, New Zealand, 1989–1991
Luis Baguena Spain, 1991–1995
Yong Sung Park, South Korea, 1995–2007
Marius Vizer, Romania/Austria, 2007– 
Vladimir Putin Russia, 2008–2022 (honorary) (expelled)

References

External links
 

 
Sports organizations established in 1951
Judo organizations
Organisations based in Lausanne
Judo